Hugh Christopher Brown is a Canadian singer-songwriter and multi-instrumentalist.

Career
Brown was one of the primary singers and songwriters for the alternative rock band Bourbon Tabernacle Choir in the 1980s and 1990s.  When that band broke up, he continued performing as a duo with his Bourbon bandmate Kate Fenner. Brown has accompanied dozens of notable musicians on stage, including a six-month stint as a member of Barenaked Ladies in 1998 filling in for Kevin Hearn while Hearn battled leukemia.

Brown released a solo album, Burden of Belief, in 2003. He performs this material both solo and with Tony Scherr, Anton Fier, and Teddy Kumpel as Chris Brown and the Citizens' Band. The group's album Oblivion was released in 2007.

Also in 2007, musical contributions from Brown were included on Salamandre, the soundtrack for architectural designer Eric Clough's Mystery on Fifth Avenue apartment renovation project. Along with Fenner, he composed original music: four melodies of inspiration through four centuries of music, including renaissance, classical, Victorian, a Vetentian waltz, jazz, ragtime, blues, folk, and funk.

He is also a social justice activist and the founder of the Pros and Cons Program bringing recording arts to prisons and creating musical works for charities. The Pros and Cons Program has become internationally recognized as groundbreaking in fields of restorative justice and inmate mentorship, with the support of The David Rockefeller Fund. Brown recorded an album with the prisoners called Postcards from the County which Exclaim! described as "inescapably honest and sincere".

Brown has recently launched Wolfe Island Records as a home for the prison music and the many artists he produces and collaborates with, including Fenner, Suzanne Jarvie, David Corley, One River, The Mermaids, Hadley McCall Thackston and the Stephen Stanley Band. In 2017 he released a new solo album Pacem. PopMatters premiered his first single, "Keeper of the Flame", and Huffington Post raved that "Pacem is one of those albums that works on the listener from the inside out."

Brown currently lives in Wolfe Island where he tours solo and performs with local musicians in a band called Open Hearts Society.

Discography

Hugh Christopher Brown
Pacem - 2017

Chris Brown
 Burden of Belief – 2003

Chris Brown and the Citizens' Band
 Oblivion – 2007

Chris Brown and Kate Fenner
 Other People's Heavens – 1997
 Geronimo – 1999
 Great Lakes Bootleg – 2000
 O Witness – 2001
 Songs – 2003
 Go On – 2004

Bourbon Tabernacle Choir
 First Taste of Bourbon – 1987
 If Hell Had a Houseband – 1989
 Sister Anthony – 1990
 Superior Cackling Hen – 1992
 Shy Folk – 1995
 Simply the Best 1985–1995 – 2000

Contributions to other artists' albums

 Ani DiFranco – Out of Range
 Ashley MacIsaac – Hi™ How Are You Today?
 Barenaked Ladies – Gordon, Born on a Pirate Ship
 Big Sugar – Five Hundred Pounds
 Crash Test Dummies – I Don't Care That You Don't Mind, Jingle All the Way, Puss 'n' Boots, Songs of the Unforgiven
 Christian Doscher – Go Where You're Loved
 DJ Logic – The Zen of Logic
 Hadley McCall Thackston - Hadley McCall Thackston
 Hermine Deurloo – Crazy Clock
 Jason Collett – Idols of Exile
 Rosanna Goodman – My Old Man ("Yellow Coat" and, with Kate Fenner, "The Ballad of Penny Evans")
 Jesse Harris and the Ferdinandos – The Secret Sun
 Kate Fenner – Horses and Burning Cars
 Teddy Kumpel – Songs in Tomato Sauce
 Luther Wright and the Wrongs – Rebuild the Wall, Guitar Pickin' Martyrs
 Natasha Alexandra (NLX) – Behind Your Back
 One River (Michael Quattrone) – One River (co-producer, musician)
 Po' Girl – Vagabond Lullabies
 Propagandhi – Potemkin City Limits
 Rheostatics – Whale Music, Introducing Happiness
 The Tragically Hip – Music @ Work
 Tom Jones – Burning Down The House
 Tony Scherr – Come Around, Twist in the Wind
 Rod Alonzo – Cyclists (co-producer, arranger, keyboards)

Compilations
 GASCD
 We Want Peace On Earth
 Bridge to Music – Indie Sounds From Brooklyn's Underground
 My Old Man: A Tribute to Steve Goodman

References

External links
Chris Brown's official website
Wolfe Island Records official website

Living people
Canadian male singer-songwriters
Canadian rock singers
Canadian folk singer-songwriters
Musicians from Toronto
Year of birth missing (living people)
Barenaked Ladies members